This is a list of films and TV films about the American Revolution.

 1776, or The Hessian Renegades – 1909 film by D.W. Griffith
 1776 – 1972 film based on the 1969 Broadway musical production, starring William Daniels, Howard Da Silva, Ken Howard, Donald Madden and John Cullum. Directed by Peter H. Hunt.
 A More Perfect Union: America Becomes a Nation - 1989 film about the 1787 Constitutional Convention, produced by Brigham Young University and directed by Peter Johnson
 Alexander Hamilton – 1931 film starring George Arliss and directed by John G. Adolfi.
 All For Liberty- 2009 historical film that depicts the true events of Captain Henry Felder, an American Revolution hero from South Carolina. PG-13. Drama.
 America – 1924 film; epic directed by D.W. Griffith and starring Lionel Barrymore.
 April Morning – 1987 starring Chad Lowe, Tommy Lee Jones, and Robert Urich.
 Benedict Arnold: A Question of Honor – 2003 film starring: Aidan Quinn as Benedict Arnold and Kelsey Grammer as George Washington.
 Beyond the Mask – 2015 film
 Cardigan – 1922 film
 Drums Along the Mohawk – 1939 film starring: Claudette Colbert and Henry Fonda; Directed by John Ford
 Hamilton - 2020 film presentation of the 2015 musical, directed by Thomas Kail and written by and starring Lin-Manuel Miranda.
 Independence – 1976 docudrama film directed by John Huston, narrated by E. G. Marshall and starring Eli Wallach, Pat Hingle, Ken Howard and Anne Jackson; shown continuously at Philadelphia's Independence Visitor Center.
 John Adams is a television miniseries that was aired on HBO in 2008.  The miniseries was directed by Tom Hooper and starred Paul Giamatti as John Adams and Laura Linney as Abigail Adams.  The miniseries takes place before, during, and after the American Revolution.
 John Paul Jones – 1959 film directed by John Farrow, starring Robert Stack and Charles Coburn
 Johnny Tremain – 1957 film adaptation of the 1943 Esther Forbes novel starring Hal Stalmaster and, among others, Walter Coy. Directed by Robert Stevenson
 La Fayette – 1961 film
 Liberty's Kids – 2002–2004 PBS animated series.
 Revolution – 1985 film starring Al Pacino. Directed by Hugh Hudson
 Scouting for Washington – 1917 Edison Studios
 Sons of Liberty – 1939 film starring: Claude Rains, Gale Sondergaard; Director: Michael Curtiz.
 Sons of Liberty – 2015 miniseries starring Ben Barnes, Rafe Spall, Henry Thomas, Dean Norris and Jason O'Mara; Director: Kari Skogland; produced for broadcast by The History Channel
 The Crossing – 2000 film starring: Jeff Daniels, Roger Rees, Director: Robert Harmon; screenwriter Howard Fast based on his novel; produced for broadcast by the Arts and Entertainment cable television network
 The Devil's Disciple – 1959 film adaptation of the 1897 play by George Bernard Shaw; starring Burt Lancaster, Kirk Douglas, and Laurence Olivier. Directed by Guy Hamilton
 The Devil's Disciple – 1987 TV film adaptation of the 1897 play by George Bernard Shaw; starring: Patrick Stewart, Director: David Jones
 The Heart of a Hero - 1916 film about Nathan Hale based on the 1898 play Nathan Hale by Clyde Fitch, directed by Emile Chautard and starring Robert Warwick. 
 The Howards of Virginia – 1940 Starring: Cary Grant, Director: Frank Lloyd
 The Patriot – 2000 film starring: Mel Gibson, Heath Ledger, Director: Roland Emmerich
 The Pursuit of Happiness - 1934 film
 The Rebels – 1979 TV miniseries based on the 1975 novel by John Jakes, starring Andrew Stevens
 The Scarlet Coat – 1955 film directed by John Sturges, focuses on Benedict Arnold
 The Spirit of '76 – 1917 film
 The Time of Their Lives – 1946, Abbott and Costello Comedy. Directed by Charles Barton.
 Turn: Washington's Spies – 2014–17 AMC television series

 Washington - 2020 six-hour television miniseries that aired on The History Channel. Directed by Matthew Ginsburg, starring Nicholas Rowe as George Washington, and narrated by Jeff Daniels, the series covers Washington's life from his birth to his death at age 67.  
 We Fight to Be Free - 2006 short biographical film about George Washington. Directed by Kees Van Oostrum and starring Sebastian Roché.
 Where Do We Go from Here? – 1945, Comedy. Directed by Gregory Ratoff, starring Fred MacMurray.
 Williamsburg: the Story of a Patriot – 1957 film shown at Colonial Williamsburg continually since 1957. Directed by George Seaton, starring Jack Lord.

See also 
 British Empire in fiction
 Commemoration of the American Revolution
 Founding Fathers of the United States
 Historical drama
 List of television series and miniseries about the American Revolution
 List of plays and musicals about the American Revolution
 List of films about revolution

References

Further reading 
 Glancy,  Mark. "The war of independence in feature films: The Patriot (2000) and the 'special relationship' between Hollywood and Britain." Historical Journal of Film, Radio and Television 25.4 (2005): 523-545.
 Harrington. Hugh T. "Top 10 Revolutionary War Movies" Journal of the American Revolution (Jan. 25 2013) online
 Murray, Lawrence L. "Feature Films and the American Revolution: A Bicentennial Reappraisal." Film & History 5.3 (1975): 1-6.
 Rhoden, Nancy L. "Patriots, Villains, and the Quest for Liberty: How American Film has Depicted the American Revolution." Canadian Review of American Studies 37.2 (2007): 205-238.
 Schocket, Andrew M. "The American سكسي 
 "Rebooted: Hamilton and Genre in Contemporary Culture." Journal of the Early Republic 37#2 (2017): 263-269.

 
Films
 
American Revolution